William R. Richardson (1842 – October 24, 1873) was an American soldier who fought for the Union Army during the American Civil War. He received the Medal of Honor for valor.

Biography
Reeder received the Medal of Honor in April 7, 1866 for his actions at the Battle of Sayler's Creek during the Third Battle of Petersburg on April 6, 1865 while with Company A of the 2nd Ohio Cavalry.

Medal of Honor citation

Citation:

The President of the United States of America, in the name of Congress, takes pleasure in presenting the Medal of Honor to Private William R. Richardson, United States Army, for extraordinary heroism in action at Sailor's Creek, Virginia, on 6 April 1865. Having been captured and taken to the rear, Private Richardson made his escape rejoined the Union lines, and furnished information of great importance as to the enemy's position and the approaches thereto.

See also

 List of American Civil War Medal of Honor recipients: Q–S

References

External links
 

1842 births
1873 deaths
Union Army soldiers
United States Army Medal of Honor recipients
American Civil War recipients of the Medal of Honor
Military personnel from Cleveland